Pundlik Hari Danve (1926 – 1 November 2021) was a member of the 6th Lok Sabha (1977) and 9th Lok Sabha (1989) of India. He represented the Jalna constituency of Maharashtra and was a member of the Bharatiya Janata Party as well as Janata Party.

References

1926 births
2021 deaths
India MPs 1977–1979
India MPs 1989–1991
Marathi politicians
Janata Party politicians
Bharatiya Janata Party politicians from Maharashtra
Lok Sabha members from Maharashtra
People from Jalna district